Kaleidoscope World may refer to:

Kaleidoscope World (The Chills album)
"Kaleidoscope World" (The Chills song), 1982 single by The Chills
Kaleidoscope World (Swing Out Sister album)
"Kaleidoscope World" (Francis Magalona song)